The New Age was a British weekly magazine (1894–1938), inspired by Fabian socialism, and credited as a major influence on literature and the arts during its heyday from 1907 to 1922, when it was edited by Alfred Richard Orage. It published work by many of the chief political commentators of the day, such as George Bernard Shaw, H. G. Wells, Hilaire Belloc, G. K. Chesterton and Arnold Bennett.

History
The New Age began life in 1894 as a publication of the Christian socialist movement, but in 1907, as a radical weekly edited by Joseph Clayton, it was struggling. In May of that year, Orage and Holbrook Jackson, who had been running the Leeds Arts Club, took over the journal with financial help from George Bernard Shaw. Jackson acted as co-editor only for the first year, after which Orage edited it alone until he sold it in 1922. By that time his interests had moved towards mysticism, and the quality and circulation of the journal had declined. According to a Brown University press release, "The New Age helped to shape modernism in literature and the arts from 1907 to 1922". It ceased publication in 1938. Orage was also associated with The New English Weekly (1932–1949), as editor, during its first two years of operation (Philip Mairet took over at his death in 1934).

Content
The magazine began as a journal of Christian liberalism and socialism. Orage and Jackson re-oriented it to promote the ideas of Nietzsche, Fabian socialism and later a form of guild socialism. But The New Age did publish opposing viewpoints and arguments, even on issues upon which Orage had strong opinions. Topics covered in detail included: 

 the role of private property – in a debate between H. G. Wells and Shaw against G. K. Chesterton and Hilaire Belloc
 the need for a socialist party (as distinct from the newly formed Labour Party)
 women's suffrage

On this last point, the editorial line moved from initial support to bitter opposition by 1912. As The New Age moved away from Fabian politics, the leaders of the Fabian Society, Beatrice and Sydney Webb founded the journal The New Statesman to counter its effect in 1913, and this, combined with the growing distance between Orage and the mainstream left, reduced its influence. By then, the editorial line supported guild socialism, expounded in articles by G. D. H. Cole and S. G. Hobson among others. After World War I, Orage began to support the social credit theory of C. H. Douglas.

The New Age also concerned itself with the definition and development of modernism in the visual arts, literature and music, and consistently observed, reviewed and contributed to the activities of the movement.

The journal became one of the first places in England in which Sigmund Freud's ideas were discussed before the First World War, in particular by David Eder, an early British psychoanalyst.

Production

The journal appeared weekly, and featured a wide cross-section of writers with an interest in literature and the arts, but also politics, spiritualism and economics.

With its woodprint illustrations reminiscent of artwork by the German Expressionists, its mixture of culture, politics, Nietzschean philosophy and spiritualism, and its non-standard appearance, The New Age has been cited as the English equivalent of the German Expressionist periodical Der Sturm, a journal to which it bore a striking resemblance.

Notable contributors 

 Boris Anrep
 Michael Arlen (Dikran Kouyoumdjian)
 Belfort Bax
 Hilaire Belloc
 Arnold Bennett
 Cecil Chesterton
 G. K. Chesterton
 G. D. H. Cole
 C. H. Douglas
 Arthur Kitson
 David Eder
 Havelock Ellis
 Florence Farr
 Beatrice Hastings
 T. E. Hulme
 Herbert Hughes
 Holbrook Jackson
 Oscar Levy

 Anthony Ludovici
 Hugh MacDiarmid
 Ramiro de Maeztu
 Katherine Mansfield
 Dimitrije Mitrinovic
 Edwin Muir
 P. D. Ouspensky
 Alfred Orage
 A. J. Penty
 Marmaduke Pickthall
 Ezra Pound
 Herman George Scheffauer
 Hugh Pembroke Vowles
 H. G. Wells
 Herbert Read
 Clifford Sharp
 Kaikhosru Shapurji Sorabji
 George Bernard Shaw
 Walter Sickert

References

External links 

 Complete archive of The New Age under Orage (1907–1922) at the Modernist Journals Project. PDFs of all 783 weekly issues (and 42 supplements) may be downloaded for free at the MJP website.

1894 establishments in the United Kingdom
1938 disestablishments in the United Kingdom
Christian socialist publications
Defunct literary magazines published in the United Kingdom
Defunct political magazines published in the United Kingdom
Magazines disestablished in 1938
Magazines established in 1894
Religious magazines published in the United Kingdom
Socialist magazines
Weekly magazines published in the United Kingdom